Blissus is a genus in the true bug family Blissidae, commonly called chinch bugs in North America. The review by Slater (1979) listed 27 species. The species B. leucopterus, B. occiduus and B. insularis are important pests of cereal crops and turf grasses in their different ranges in the United States.

List of species
 Blissus antillus Leonard, 1968
 Blissus arenarius Barber, 1918
 Blissus arenarius maritimus Leonard, 1966
 Blissus barberi Leonard, 1968
 Blissus bosqi Drake, 1940
 Blissus brasiliensis Drake, 1951
 Blissus breviusculus Barber, 1937
 Blissus canadensis Leonard, 1970
 Blissus hygrobius (Jensen-Haarup, 1920)
 Blissus insularis Barber, 1918 - southern chinch bug
 Blissus iowensis Andre, 1937
 Blissus leucopterus (Say, 1831) - true chinch bug 
 Blissus leucopterus hirtus Montandon, 1893 - hairy chinch bug 
 Blissus minutus (Blatchley, 1925)
 Blissus mixtus Barber, 1937
 Blissus nanus Barber, 1937
 Blissus occiduus Barber, 1918 - western chinch bug
 Blissus omani Barber, 1937
 Blissus parasitaster (Bergroth, 1903)
 Blissus penningtoni Drake, 1941
 Blissus planarius Barber, 1937
 Blissus planus Leonard, 1968
 Blissus pulchellus Montandon, 1893
 Blissus richardsoni Drake, 1940
 Blissus slateri Leonard, 1968
 Blissus sweeti Leonard, 1968
 Blissus villosus Barber, 1937
 Blissus weiseri (Drake, 1951)
 Blissus yumana Drake, 1951

References

Blissidae
Pentatomomorpha genera